Diego Wong (born 19 August 1977) is a Cuban handball player. He competed in the men's tournament at the 2000 Summer Olympics.

References

External links
 

1977 births
Living people
Cuban male handball players
Olympic handball players of Cuba
Handball players at the 2000 Summer Olympics
Place of birth missing (living people)